Yuka Kanazawa (born August 19, 1978) is a Japanese former competitive figure skater. She is a two-time Japanese national bronze medalist. She placed 8th at the 1998 World Junior Championships in Saint John, New Brunswick, Canada; 11th at the 1999 Four Continents Championships in Halifax, Nova Scotia, Canada; and fourth at the 1999 Winter Universiade in Žilina, Slovakia. She competed at five Champions Series/Grand Prix events, achieving her best result, fourth, at the 1998 Cup of Russia.

Competitive highlights 
GP: Champions Series/Grand Prix

References 

1978 births
Japanese female single skaters
Living people
Sportspeople from Miyagi Prefecture
Competitors at the 1999 Winter Universiade
Competitors at the 2001 Winter Universiade